The long-running science fiction television series Doctor Who has, over the years, been the subject of many parodies, including comedy sketches and specially made comedy programmes, from Spike Milligan's "Pakistani Dalek" to the Comic Relief episode Doctor Who and the Curse of Fatal Death.  There have been occasional parodies and references to Doctor Who on American TV shows such as Community, Saturday Night Live, The Simpsons, Late Night with Conan O'Brien, Robot Chicken, and The Colbert Report. Some notable examples follow, categorized by medium.

Television

It's a Square World (1963)
An early televised Doctor Who spoof was on the Michael Bentine sketch show It's a Square World in December 1963, only a few weeks after the series first aired. Season 6, Episode 8, broadcast on New Year's Eve, featured Clive Dunn playing a scientist called Doctor Fotheringown ("Doctor Who?" / "No, not Doctor Who, Doctor Fotheringown!"), for which Dunn wore William Hartnell's First Doctor costume and wig. The sketch, which was recorded on 16 and 20 December 1963, also featured Wilfrid Brambell and Patrick Moore.

The Lenny Henry Show (1985) 
In one episode of The Lenny Henry Show, an untitled sketch showed a newly regenerated 7th Doctor, portrayed by Lenny Henry (who would later appear in the revival show in Spyfall: Part One and Part Two as Daniel Barton) and his companion Peri, played by Jadie Rivas, land in England in the year 2010 and face off against the Cybermen, lead by Thatchos, a parody of the now-former Prime Minister Margaret Thatcher, and her sidekick, Denos, a parody of the husband of the prior mentioned Prime Minister, Denis Thatcher.

Doctor Who and the Curse of Fatal Death (1999)

An episode made for Comic Relief with celebrity appearances from Rowan Atkinson, Joanna Lumley, Hugh Grant, Richard E. Grant (later to appear in the webcast Scream of the Shalka and cast as Dr Simeon in the 2012 Christmas episode The Snowmen), and Jim Broadbent as various incarnations of the Doctor and Jonathan Pryce as the Master. The writer of the sketch, Steven Moffat, subsequently went on to become a writer and executive producer on the show proper following its 2005 revival.

Doctors (2008)
In an episode of the ninth series of Doctors, Sylvester McCoy made a guest appearance where he played a retired actor named Graham Capelli who played a time traveller in a television show called The Lollipop Man where he could travel through time with his traffic lollipop stick. Graham also has to provide commentary for the DVD release of the show.

My Little Pony: Friendship Is Magic (2010)
The series My Little Pony: Friendship Is Magic features occasional appearances by the character Doctor Hooves, sometimes also named Doctor Whooves and Time Turner. In the fifth season episode "Slice of Life" he is seen wearing a scarf of a similar coloration as the Fourth Doctor's.

Dorkly (2011)
In the episode "Chrono Trigger Time Travel Mix-Up" of Dorkly, the characters from the game Chrono Trigger meet the Doctor who tells them that Lavos was in fact a friendly being trying to return to its home planet.

Community (2011) and Inspector Spacetime
During the episode "Biology 101" of Community, Britta searches for a new television series for Abed to watch. She eventually shows him a sci-fi series called Inspector Spacetime, a thinly veiled parody of Doctor Who. Troy and Abed have been seen watching Inspector Spacetime throughout the third season. The season four episode "Conventions of Space and Time" sees the group travel to a fan convention for the show, with Matt Lucas guest starring. Lucas would later go on to become the companion Nardole on Doctor Who in 2015.

Inspector Spacetime has proved popular with Doctor Who fandom, and has taken on a life of its own beyond Community. Many parodies, fleshed out backstories, and unauthorised straight-to-web videos (produced by and starring the original Inspector actor) have been created.

Milo Murphy's Law (2016) 
Multiple episodes of the show Milo Murphy's Law reference an in-show program called The Doctor Zone Files, a very obvious parody of Doctor Who. The first appearance of the show would appear in the third episode of Milo Murphy's Law, The Doctor Zone Files, where Milo Murphy's sister, Sara, "wants to see The Doctor Zone Files movie with Milo, but worries about potential problems."

The titular character of this show within a show, full name Doctor Hankry Zone, had a companion similar to The Doctor, a gorilla with a clock for a head named Time Ape who is the brother of Doctor Zone. In the fictional intro of the show, he is described as having "one foot in the future, and one foot in the past. He's got one hand in the present, or at least in a gift shaped cast." This is in reference to his costume where one foot wears a shoe from the past, the other wears a shoe from the future, and his hand is in a present.

Doctor Zone was played by Orton Mahlson who also created the show (both characters were played by Jemaine Clement). Orton also created the show and characters based on his experiences travelling in time with Dr. Heinz Doofenshmirtz to save the world from being taken over by evil pistachio monsters.

Radio

Dr. Prune and the Electric Time Trousers (I'm Sorry, I'll Read That Again) (1969)
This was a radio serial, stretched over 13 episodes of Series 7 of the popular radio comedy. This series went out on Radios 1 and 2 at 9.30 pm from 12 January to 6 April 1969 with the usual line-up (John Cleese, Bill Oddie, Tim Brooke-Taylor, Graeme Garden and Jo Kendall, except episode 4 where Oddie was absent). The shows were produced by David Hatch and Peter Titheradge.

Video games

Hugo II: Whodunit? (1991)
In this DOS video game, the player uses a telephone booth to travel to the planet Retupmoc where she meets a man who looks like Tom Baker's Fourth Doctor and identifies himself as "the Doctor". A "mechanical monster" appears to be a Dalek, and the phone booth looks like the TARDIS. The Doctor gives the player a "sonar screwdriver" for rescuing him.

Print media

Dragon Magazine
In the Dragon Magazine AD&D adventure "The City Beyond The Gate", the Fourth Doctor can be met (but not interacted with) as a short one-time random encounter.

Dalek Survival Guide (2002)
Dalek Survival Guide was a humorous book published by BBC Books and written by Justin Richards, Nicholas Briggs (who provides voice acting for the Daleks in the 2005 series), Stephen Cole, Jacqueline Rayner and Mike Tucker. Parodying The Worst-Case Scenario Survival Handbooks, the Dalek Survival Guide gives wry hints such as how Daleks work, how to recognise different Dalek variants, "How to survive enforced captivity with a Dalek" and "What to do if you see a Dalek".

This book became the subject of legal action due to copyright issues. However, the issues were ruled against, and the book continues to be sold.

The Beano (2006)
Beginning in their 21 April issue, The Beano ran a three-part parody comic-within-a-comic by writer-artist Kev F Sutherland called "Hot-Rod Cow", about a superhero time-travelling talking cow named Hot-Rod Cow. "Hot-Rod Cow" is the favourite comic of The Bash Street Kids character, Plug. The comic contained many in-jokes, for example Hot-Rod Cow wielded a "Sonic Moo-driver". The phrase "Hot-Rod Cow" is an anagram of "Doctor Who". The comic also spoofed classic comic covers such as Amazing Fantasy #15 (Spider-Man's first appearance), as well as containing other superhero related jokes.

Rick and Morty (2015–2020)
In the April 2015 first issue of the Oni Press' original ongoing Rick and Morty comic book series, a part of the story arc The Wubba Lubba Dub Dub of Wall Street, a "time detective" based on the Doctor, named Professor Tock, is introduced as an adversary of Rick's, who wears a colorful suit, is prone to making watch-related puns, and manipulates Jerry Smith into giving up his son Morty and father-in-law Rick Sanchez to the Time Police.

Subsequently, the story arcs The Ricky Horror Peacock Show, Rick Revenge Squad, and The Rickoning feature a second character based on the Doctor, a four-armed alien named Peacock Jones who goes through an endless cycle of female companions on adventures on his spaceship. In The Ricky Horror Peacock Show, Jones takes Summer Smith as his latest companion, only to come to odds with her when she rejects his advances, and he is then framed as a drug kingpin by Summer's grandfather Rick Sanchez, and imprisoned alongside a Mr. Meeseeks in space prison. In Rick Revenge Squad, Jones returns as a member of the titular squad (put together by Party Dog), seeking revenge on Rick for his incarceration, alongside the Meeseeks, now his best friend and named "Mr. Sick". After attempting to reach Summer, Jones is beaten up by her mother Beth, and decides to cut his losses and leave. In The Rickoning, on the run from Party Dog's criminal empire (who blame him for their boss' death), and drinking at a bar, mourning Mr. Sick, Jones is advised by a hooded figure (a member of the IllumiRicki) that separating Rick from his grandson Morty Smith (and acquiring more intelligence) will leave the former vulnerable. Inspired, Jones breaks into the Smith family's garage when Rick and Morty are away, and steals a large quantity of the former's gear, and after time has passed, ambushes Morty at Dimension 35-C, kidnapping and consuming a large quantity of intelligence-boosting Mega-Seeds. After engaging Rick in a combat in a reality where-in Rick and Morty is a fictional multimedia franchise, Jones lures Rick and Jerry onto his ship (which is bigger on the inside), where he has a robot army and Meeseeks Box to oppose Rick and his allies, using a Meeseeks army to also kidnap Beth and Summer, and chase down Rick. However, once the Mega-Seeds wear off, Jones is quickly killed by Beth and Summer, who use the chains he attached to them to decapitate him. As the reunited Smith family portal away, they remain oblivious to Jones having brainwashed Morty to kill Rick.

Music

"I'm Gonna Spend My Christmas with a Dalek" (1964)
"I'm Gonna Spend My Christmas with a Dalek" is a song released the first Christmas after The Daleks was initially broadcast. The British Go-Go's novelty single tried to turn the sinister Daleks into another version of The Chipmunks, and was originally released as one of the many products fueling Dalekmania.

However, as that craze fizzled out the song was largely forgotten, with snippets occasionally appearing in Doctor Who anthological products. It finally resurfaced in its entirety on the October 2000 album, Who Is Dr Who.

"Doctorin' the Tardis" (1988)
"Doctorin' the Tardis" is an electronic novelty pop single by The Timelords ("Time Boy" and "Lord Rock", aliases of Bill Drummond and Jimmy Cauty, better known as The KLF). The song is predominantly a mash-up of the Doctor Who theme music, Gary Glitter's "Rock and Roll (Part Two)" with sections from "Blockbuster!" by Sweet and "Let's Get Together Tonite" by Steve Walsh. The single became a commercial success, reaching number 1 in the UK Singles Chart and charting in the Top 10 in Australia and Norway. The song was also mashed-up with Green Day's Holiday for the album American Edit.

See also
Doctor Who in popular culture

References

External links
 TV Ark page on Doctor Who spoof sketches
 Official Dead Ringers site, including some streaming clips of Doctor Who parody

List of Doctor Who parodies
Parodies of television shows
Parodies